"Skyscraping" is a song by new wave group ABC, released as the second single from their album Skyscraping.

Track listing

UK CD single 
 "Skyscraping"
 "Light Years"
 "Skydubbing" 
 "Stranger Things" (Live)

UK promo CD single 
 "Skyscraping" (Radio edit)

Chart performance

References

ABC (band) songs
1997 songs
Songs written by Martin Fry
Songs written by Glenn Gregory
Songs written by Keith Lowndes
1997 singles